Stewartia as described by Philibert Commerçon is a synonym of Dombeya.

Stewartia (sometimes spelled Stuartia) is a genus of 8-20 species of flowering plants in the family Theaceae, related to Camellia. Most of the species are native to eastern Asia in China, Japan, Korea, Laos, Myanmar, Thailand, and Vietnam, with two (S. malacodendron, S. ovata) in southeast North America, from Virginia and Kentucky south to Florida and Louisiana.

They are shrubs and trees, mostly deciduous, though some species (e.g. S. pteropetiolata) are evergreen; the evergreen species form a genetically distinct group and are split into a separate genus Hartia by some botanists, but others retain them within Stewartia. The Asian species include both shrubs and trees, growing to 3–20 m tall, while the American species are shrubs growing 3–5 m tall, rarely becoming small trees. The bark is very distinctive, smooth orange to yellow-brown, peeling in fine flakes. The leaves are alternately arranged, simple, serrated, usually glossy, and 3–14 cm long. The flowers are large and conspicuous, 3–11 cm diameter, with 5 (occasionally 6-8) white petals; flowering is in mid to late summer. The fruit is a dry five-valved capsule, with one to four seeds in each section.

The species are adapted to acidic soils, and do not grow well on chalk or other calcium-rich soils. They also have a high rainfall requirement and will not tolerate drought.

Etymology
The genus was named in 1753 by Carl Linnaeus to honour John Stuart, 3rd Earl of Bute. Owing to a transcription error, Linnaeus was given the name as 'Stewart', and consequently spelled the name "Stewartia" (and continued to do so in all his subsequent publications). Some botanists and horticulturists, mainly in the past but still widely in the UK have interpreted Article 60 of the International Code of Botanical Nomenclature to consider "Stewartia" an orthographical error to be corrected to Stuartia, but this type of correction has been discouraged by changes to the code in recent times.

During the 19th century, the spelling Stuartia was "almost universally" used. However, the original spelling "Stewartia" has been accepted by virtually all systematic botanists in recent treatments of the family  and genus  as well as in numerous influential horticultural publications.

Cultivation and uses
Several species of Stewartia are grown as ornamental plants for their very decorative smooth orange bark and their flowers produced at a time of year when few other trees are in flower.

Species
The following species are accepted:

Stewartia acutisepala P.L.Chiu & G.R.Zhong
Stewartia calcicola T.L.Ming & J.Li
Stewartia cordifolia (H.L.Li) J.Li & T.L.Ming
Stewartia crassifolia (S.Z.Yan) J.Li & T.L.Ming
Stewartia densivillosa (Hu ex Hung T.Chang & C.X.Ye) J.Li & T.L.Ming
Stewartia laotica (Gagnep.) J.Li & T.L.Ming
Stewartia malacodendron L.
Stewartia medogensis J.Li & T.L.Ming
Stewartia micrantha (Chun) Sealy
Stewartia monadelpha Siebold & Zucc.
Stewartia obovata (Chun ex Hung T.Chang) J.Li & T.L.Ming
Stewartia ovata (Cav.) Weath.
Stewartia pseudocamellia Maxim.
Stewartia pteropetiolata W.C.Cheng
Stewartia rostrata Spongberg
Stewartia rubiginosa Hung T.Chang
Stewartia serrata Maxim.
Stewartia sichuanensis (S.Z.Yan) J.Li & T.L.Ming
Stewartia sinensis Rehder & E.H.Wilson
Stewartia sinii (Y.C.Wu) Sealy
Stewartia tonkinensis (Merr.) C.Y.Wu ex J.Li
Stewartia villosa Merr.

References

 
Ericales genera